Elavon Inc., formerly NOVA, is a processor of credit card transactions and a subsidiary of U.S. Bancorp. Elavon offers merchant processing in more than 30 countries and supports the payment needs of more than 1,000,000 merchant locations across the globe. Elavon is the 4th largest U.S. credit card processor and is a top 6 acquirer in the European marketplace.

History
In May 2000, Nova Corporation and the Bank of Ireland announced the formation a joint venture in Dublin, Ireland, to be called EuroConex Technologies which would process card payment throughout Ireland and eventually the rest of Europe.

In May 2001, U.S. Bancorp announced the acquisition of NOVA Corporation for $2.1 billion in stock and cash.

In 2004, NOVA announced that EuroConex was to buy Polish processor "CardPoint" from "Bank Zachodni WBK", owned by Allied Irish Banks, This move allowed Bank Zachodni WBK to "sponsor" Euroconex's operations in Poland.

NOVA announced deals with the Spanish Banco Santander, and the UK-based Alliance & Leicester, with 27,000 merchant accounts.

In April 2004, Nova Corporation announced that it was buying the rest of EuroConex that it did not own from the Bank of Ireland for €40m.

In April 2008, NOVA Information Systems was renamed Elavon.

In November 2019 Elavon announced the acquisition of the UK and Irish Sage Pay business from Sage Group for £232 million.

See also
 US Bankcard Services Inc

References

External links

Merchant services
Payment systems
Financial technology companies
U.S. Bancorp
Companies based in Atlanta
2001 mergers and acquisitions